Leucanopsis apicepunctata is a moth of the family Erebidae. It was described by William Schaus in 1905. It is found in Peru, Ecuador and Bolivia.

References

apicepunctata
Moths described in 1905